Chandpur Dam, is an earthfill dam on Chandpur river near Tumsar, Bhandara district in the state of Maharashtra in India.

It is also

Specifications

Purpose
 Irrigation

See also
 Dams in Maharashtra
 List of reservoirs and dams in India

References

Dams in Bhandara district
Dams completed in 1915
1915 establishments in India